Magazines published in Argentina enjoyed higher levels of circulation in the 1990s. However, their sales declined following the economic crisis in 2001. In 2007 there were nearly 600 titles in the country.

The following is an incomplete list of current and defunct magazines published in Argentina. They may be published in Spanish or in other languages.

A

 Aerolineas Argentinas Magazine
 ALMA Magazine
 America y Oriente
 Antena
 Atlántida

B
 Balam
 Banqueros & Empresarios
 Biliken

C

 Cabildo
 Caras
 Caras y Caretas
 Cielos Argentinos
 Confidentiel
 Convivimos

D
 Dorem Amerike

E
 Elle Argentina

F
  Fray Mocho 
 El Federal

G
 Gente
Gente y la actualidad
 El Gráfico
 El Guardián

H
 Hora Cero
 Humor
 Humor Registrado

I
 Imagofagia
 Indie Hoy

L
 Lonely Planet Magazine
 Lúpin

M

 Madhouse
 Martín Fierro (1904–1905)
 Martín Fierro (1924-1927)
 Metal
 Mundo Argentino
 Mundo Nuevo

N

 Naivelt
 Newsweek Argentina
 Newsweek Selecciones
 Nosotros
 Noticias
 La Nueva República

P

 Parsec
 Primera Plana
 Propuesta y control
 Punto de Vista

R
 Rico Tipo
 Riff Raff

S

 Semanario
 Skorpio
 Solosol
 Sur
 Susana

T
 Tía Vicenta

V
 Veintitrés

W
 Der Weg

Z
 Zone Magazine

See also
 List of newspapers in Argentina
 Mass media in Argentina

References

Argentina
Lists of mass media in Argentina